Teatro Dermeval Gonçalves (formerly Teatro Record) is a theatre in São Paulo, Brazil.

Theatres in São Paulo